The Council of Protestants in Guiding and Scouting (CPGS) is an autonomous, international body committed to promoting and supporting Protestant Scout and Guide associations and to be a link between the Scout movement and Protestant churches based on the definition of the World Council of Churches (WCC).

It enjoys consultative status with the World Scout Committee and forms the World Scout Inter-religious Forum (WSIF) together with the International Link of Orthodox Christian Scouts, International Catholic Conference of Scouting, International Union of Muslim Scouts, International Forum of Jewish Scouts, Won-Buddhism Scout and World Buddhist Scout Brotherhood.

History 
The CPGS was founded as Conference on Christianity in Guiding and Scouting (CCGS) in 1965. In 2006, it was renamed to Council of Protestants in Guiding and Scouting reflecting a change of policy within the World Organization of the Scout Movement.

Members 
The members of the CPGS are:
 Argentina: Scouts de Argentina, Comisión Pastoral Scout Cristiano Evangélica
 Cameroon: Les Scouts du Cameroun
 Denmark: KFUM-Spejderne i Danmark
 Finland: Suomen Partiolaiset - Finlands Scouter ry
 France: Eclaireuses et Eclaireurs Unionistes de France
 Germany: Verband Christlicher Pfadfinderinnen und Pfadfinder
 Hungary: ICHTHÜSZ – Protestant unit of the Hungarian Scout Association
 Ivory Coast:
 Éclaireuses et Éclaireurs Unionistes de Côte d’Ivoire 
 Éclaireuses et Éclaireurs de Côte d’Ivoire (associate member)
 Fédération Ivoirienne du Scoutisme (observer)

Provisional members are currently:
 Democratic Republic of the Congo: Fédération des Scouts de la République démocratique du Congo
 Guinea-Bissau: Escuteiros da Guiné-Bissau (observer)

See also 
 Religion in Scouting

References

External links 
 
 Presentation on scout.org

International Scouting organizations
Christianity and society